Paul Theodore Arlt (March 15, 1914, New York City - September 20, 2005, Rye, New York) was an American painter. Arlt graduated from Colgate University in 1933.

References

1914 births
2005 deaths
20th-century American painters
American male painters
Colgate University alumni
Section of Painting and Sculpture artists
Menschel family
20th-century American male artists